Loviatar (alternative names Loveatar, Lovetar, Lovehetar, Louhetar, Louhiatar, Louhi) is a blind daughter of Tuoni, the god of death in Finnish mythology and his spouse Tuonetar, the queen of the underworld. Loviatar is regarded as a goddess of death and disease. In Runo 45 of the Kalevala, Loviatar is impregnated by a great wind and gives birth to nine sons, the Nine diseases. In other folk songs, she gives birth to a tenth child, who is a girl.

In the Kalevala
Loviatar appears in Rune 45:

Relation to Louhi
When Elias Lönnrot compiled the Kalevala, he made Loviatar and Louhi two different characters. However, in the folk songs from which he compiled the epic, the names are often used interchangeably, and in some songs Louhi herself is the mother of the nine diseases. Other songs give Loviatar the title "Whore Mistress of Pohjola".

There is one difference between Louhi and the various forms of Loviatar in the songs: Loviatar's name occurs only in spells where diseases are banished to go back to her, while Louhi's name occurs also in epic or narrative songs. She gives quests to heroes, and opposes Lemminkäinen in a spell contest.

One hypothesis is that Louhi and Loviatar were regional variants of the same goddess, and that the epic songs were composed in an area where Louhi was the primary name. A large portion of the epic songs about the Mistress of Pohjola do not give her any name.

See also
Syöjätär: in some variants of Finnish folk songs, Syöjätär is the offspring of Loviatar's tenth child.

References

Finnish goddesses
Death goddesses
Characters in the Kalevala
Evil deities